The Welland International Flatwater Centre is a current canoeing, kayaking and rowing facility in Welland, Ontario, Canada and was used for the 2013 ICF Junior and U23 Canoe Sprint World Championships and the 2015 Pan American Games. The facility was renovated in 2013, before the U23 championships began.

Renovations
For the Championships and the Pan American Games, improvements to the venue included widening of the canal to bring the venue up to conditions and meet international standards, and also included the addition of buildings along the course. The facility's improvements cost about $10 million Canadian dollars.

The facility has hosted many competitions in many sports among them canoeing, open water swimming and dragon boat racing. After the games the facility reverted to a public use canal.

The facility was the host site for the 2018 Canoe Polo World Championships.

See also
Venues of the 2015 Pan American and Parapan American Games

References

External links
Official Website

Venues of the 2015 Pan American Games
Welland Canal
Canoeing in Canada
Canoeing and kayaking venues
Sport in Welland